Dashin' Desperadoes is a platform game by Data East for the Sega Genesis released in 1993. In the game players control one of two cowboys, Will or Rick, who run and negotiate various obstacles to reach the maiden Jenny.

Playing the game on Japanese hardware yields an alternate title, Rumble Kids, despite being never released in Japan. In 1993, Data East also released a Neo-Geo exclusive game titled Spinmaster featuring main characters similar to the ones in Dashin' Desperadoes.

Gameplay
In the 1-player game, the cowboy hat wearing hero, Will, races to reach Jenny, the blond-haired maiden who waits at the end of each level.  The hero is racing against his blond-haired nemesis, Rick, who also is trying to reach the girl.  Through obstacles, hazards, and various creatures, Will and Rick race each other through six different worlds (three levels each) of beaches, jungles, and ancient ruins to reach Jenny.  In the finale of each world, Jenny is kidnapped by Rick, who attempts to take her away.  The player, as the hero Will, must use all of the weapons in his arsenal to damage Rick's vehicle as it attempts to escape.

In the 2-player game, the second player takes over as Rick, and they both race after Jenny in split screen mode. Whoever arrives first receives a kiss from her.  Using bombs, barbells, electricity, and ice, each player must do whatever it takes to reach Jenny first.

External links

Sega-16

1993 video games
Data East video games
Multiplayer and single-player video games
North America-exclusive video games
Platform games

Sega Genesis games
Sega Genesis-only games
Side-scrolling video games
Video games developed in Japan
Western (genre) video games